Jose Figueroa Agosto (born "José David Figueroa Agosto" on June 28, 1964), also known as "Junior Capsula" and "the Pablo Escobar of the Caribbean", is a Puerto Rican former drug trafficker. As the head of a major drug trafficking organization that controlled 90% of cocaine in Puerto Rico, Figueroa Agosto was considered to be one of the most dangerous drug lords of Puerto Rico. He was the most wanted fugitive in Puerto Rico and the Dominican Republic at the time.

Criminal career
In 2009, he was serving a 209-year prison sentence in Puerto Rico.
In 2017, authorities believed that with the Caribbean's biggest reputed drug lord back behind bars, law enforcement authorities in the region should be on alert for potential bloody feuds among rivals and lieutenants trying to take his place. Capture of Jose Figueroa Agosto in Puerto Rico's capital after a decade-long hunt was a big break, but it also meant that members of his violent group would try to gain control of his share of the illegal trade.

Arrest and imprisonment

His romantic companion, Sobeida Felix-Morel (sometimes spelled "Sobeyda Félix Morel"), had been captured months before he was and reportedly was cooperating with authorities after appearing in pornographic videos protagonized by both of them.

He pleaded guilty to drug trafficking charges in 2012, and in 2017 he was sentenced to 30 years in prison. He was released in 2020 after serving 10 years in prison.

Sex tape
In 2010, a  sex tape of Figueroa Agosto proved to be a popular sell among porn DVD vendors in Puerto Rico and Dominican Republic.

References

1964 births
Living people
Puerto Rican drug traffickers
Puerto Rican expatriates in the Dominican Republic
Puerto Rican people convicted of murder
Prisoners and detainees of the United States federal government
People from San Juan, Puerto Rico